Tristan David "TD" Ierlan is an American professional lacrosse player who plays as a faceoff specialist for Redwoods Lacrosse Club of the Premier Lacrosse League and the Toronto Rock of the National Lacrosse League. Regarded as one of the best faceoff specialists of all time, Ierlan holds numerous NCAA records, having played at Albany, Yale, and Denver before turning professional. Additionally, he is a volunteer assistant lacrosse coach at Syracuse.

Early life and career 
Ierlan is the son of Mike and Karen Ierlan. He has a brother, Chayse, who plays lacrosse as a goaltender for Cornell, and a sister, Doyle. He attended Victor Senior High School in Victor, New York, where he earned four varsity letters in football, wrestling, and lacrosse. On the wrestling mat, Ierlan set a school record with 161 wins. In lacrosse, he won 1,135 faceoffs at an 83% win rate, as well as collecting 661 ground balls and recording 50 points over his career. He helped lead Victor to state championships in lacrosse during his final two years, being named an All-American and New York Player of the Year both times.

College career

Albany 
In his freshman year at Albany, he played for Albany Great Danes and won 70.8% of his faceoffs, with 323 total wins, which was second in NCAA history, and 202 ground balls, which was fourth in NCAA history, while also adding 10 points. He was named America East Rookie of the Year, as well as being named a first team All-America East, All-America East Rookie, and All-Tournament teams, and a second team All-American by Inside Lacrosse and third team USILA All-American. The following season, Ierlan set single-season records in faceoff percentage (79.1%), faceoff wins (359), and ground balls (254). He was named the America East Defensive Player of the Year, as well as all-Conference first team, all-Academic team, and second team an All-American by Inside Lacrosse and the USILA, as well as being a nominee for the Tewaaraton Award as Albany reached the Final Four for the first time in program history.

Yale 
Ierlan transferred to Yale following his sophomore year, as he felt he didn't fit with the Albany program. During his first season with Yale Bulldogs, Ierlan broke his own records for faceoff wins and ground balls with 393 and 293 respectively. He set the record for the best faceoff percentage in NCAA history by going 26-26 against Harvard, as well as NCAA records for faceoff wins in an NCAA tournament game (31) and ground balls in a game (29) against Georgetown. Ierlan was named a First Team All-American and was a finalist for the Tewaaraton Award, as well as Ivy League Player of the Year. During his senior season in 2020, Ierlan set the career record for faceoff wins in a game against Michigan.

Denver 
As Yale did not play in 2021 due to the COVID-19 pandemic, Ierlan transferred to Denver for his final college season. He played in nine games for the Pioneers, being named an honorable mention All-American.

Statistics

Professional career

PLL 
Ierlan was selected first overall in the 2020 Major League Lacrosse draft by the New York Lizards, though he decided to return to college instead. The following year, he was taken fourth overall by Redwoods Lacrosse Club in the Premier Lacrosse League college draft. Ierlan was an All-Star as a rookie.

Statistics

NLL 
Ierlan was selected 30th overall in the 2020 NLL Draft by the Toronto Rock despite having no experience in the box game. He made his debut in the 2022 season, playing as a defenseman and faceoff specialist.

Statistics

Playoffs

References 

1998 births
Living people

Albany Great Danes men's lacrosse players
Yale Bulldogs men's lacrosse players
Denver Pioneers men's lacrosse players
Premier Lacrosse League players
Toronto Rock players
People from Victor, New York
Lacrosse players from New York (state)
Syracuse Orange men's lacrosse coaches
American expatriate sportspeople in Canada